Palaephatus is a genus of moths in the family Palaephatidae.

Species

Subgenus Prophatus Davis, 1986
 Palaephatus albicerus
 Palaephatus amplisaccus
 Palaephatus dimorphus
 Palaephatus fusciterminus
 Palaephatus latus
 Palaephatus leucacrotus
 Palaephatus nielseni
 Palaephatus spinosus
 Palaephatus striatus
Subgenus Palaephatus
 Palaephatus albiterminus
 Palaephatus falsus
 Palaephatus luteolus
 Palaephatus pallidus

References

Palaephatidae
Monotrysia genera